Part of the AFI 100 Years… series, AFI's Greatest Movie Musicals is a list of the top musicals in American cinema. The list was unveiled by the American Film Institute at the Hollywood Bowl on September 3, 2006. Unlike most of the previous lists, it only includes 25 winners and was not presented in a televised program.

The list

External links
AFI's 100 Years of Musicals
List of the 180 nominated musicals.
List of the 25 winning musicals.

AFI 100 Years... series
 
Centennial anniversaries